Purgatory Unleashed – Live at Wacken is a live album by Swedish melodic death metal band At the Gates. It was released on 22 March 2010 via Earache Records.

Background
In summer 2008 At the Gates returned for a final tour. At the time, these were supposed to be the band's final shows; however, as of October 2013 the band has continued to play shows. This album was recorded at the Wacken Open Air festival. A DVD from the same show, The Flames of the End, has been released. The title Purgatory Unleashed is a line from the song "Blinded by Fear".

Track listing

Personnel
Adapted from Allmusic credits.

At the Gates
 Tomas "Tompa" Lindberg – vocals
 Anders Björler – guitar
 Martin Larsson – guitar
 Jonas Björler – bass
 Adrian Erlandsson – drums

References

At the Gates albums
2010 live albums